The 1995 Saskatchewan general election was held on June 21, 1995 to elect members of the Legislative Assembly of Saskatchewan.

The New Democratic Party government of Premier Roy Romanow was re-elected for a second term, although with a reduced majority.

The Liberal Party – led by Lynda Haverstock – increased its share of the popular vote; adding 9 seats in the legislature to the two seats it held previously, and became the official opposition.

Saskatchewan voters continued to punish the Progressive Conservative Party in the wake of prosecutions of former Progressive Conservative politicians for expense account fraud.  Under the leadership of Bill Boyd the party continued to lose votes, and its caucus was reduced from 10 members to 5.

Results

|- bgcolor=CCCCCC
!rowspan=2 colspan=2 align=center|Party
!rowspan=2 align=center|Party leader
!rowspan=2|Candidates
!colspan=4 align=center|Seats
!colspan=3 align=center|Popular vote
|- bgcolor="CCCCCC"
|align="center"|1991
|align="center"|Dissol.
|align="center"|Elected
|align="center"|% Change
|align="center"|#
|align="center"|%
|align="center"|% Change

|align=left|New Democratic 
|align="center"|Roy Romanow
|align="right"| 58
|align="right"|55
|align="right"|54
|align="right"| 42
|align="right"|-22.2%
|align="right"|193,053
|align="right"|47.21%
|align="right"|-3.84%

|align=left|Liberal 
|align="center"|Lynda Haverstock
|align="right"| 58
|align="right"|1
|align="right"|2
|align="right"| 11
|align="right"|+550%
|align="right"|141,873
|align="right"|34.70%
|align="right"|+11.41%

|align=left|Progressive Conservative 
|align="center"|Bill Boyd
|align="right"| 58
|align="right"|10
|align="right"|10
|align="right"| 5
|align="right"|-50%
|align="right"|73,269
|align="right"|17.92%
|align="right"|-7.62%

| colspan=2 align=left|Independent
|align="right"| 4
|align="right"|–
|align="right"|–
|align="right"| –
|align="right"|–
|align="right"|712
|align="right"|0.17%
|align="right"|+0.06%
|-
|colspan=3| Total
|align="right"| 178
|align="right"|66
|align="right"|66
|align="right"| 58
|align="right"|-12.1%
|align="right"|408,907
|align="right"|100%
|align="right"| 
|-
| align="center" colspan=11|Source: Elections Saskatchewan
|-

Percentages

Ranking

14 closest ridings

 Canora-Pelly: Ken Krawetz (Lib) def. Ron Harper (NDP) by 50 votes
 Kelvington-Wadena: June Draude (Lib) def. Darrel Cunningham (NDP) by 117 votes
 Cypress Hills: Jack Gooshen (PC) def. Barry Thienes (Lib) by 143 votes
 Athabasca: Buckley Belanger (Lib) def. Frederick John Thompson (NDP) by 159 votes
 Humboldt: Arlene Julé (Lib) def. Armand Roy (NDP) by 204 votes
 Shellbrook-Spiritwood: Lloyd Johnson (NDP) def. Bob Gerow (Lib) by 215 votes
 Estevan: Larry Ward (NDP) def. Austin Gerein (Lib) by 233 votes
 Lloydminster: Violet Stanger (NDP) def. Steven Turnbull (PC) by 266 votes
 Saskatoon Northwest: Grant Whitmore (NDP) def. Jim Melenchuk (Lib) by 284 votes
 Melville: Ron Osika (Lib) def. Evan Carlson (NDP) by 299 votes
 Regina South: Andrew Thomson (NDP) def. Ross Keith (Lib) by 318 votes
 Regina Wascana Plains: Doreen Hamilton (NDP) def. Leslie Anderson-Stodalka (Lib) by 335 votes
 Indian Head-Milestone: Lorne Scott (NDP) def. Steve Helfrick (Lib) by 359 votes
 Saskatoon Sutherland: Mark Koenker (NDP) def. Robin Bellamy (Lib) by 382 votes

Riding results
People in bold represent cabinet ministers and the Speaker. Party leaders are italicized. The symbol " ** " represents MLAs who are not running again.

Northwest Saskatchewan

Northeast Saskatchewan

East Central Saskatchewan

Southwest Saskatchewan

Southeast Saskatchewan

Saskatoon

Regina

See also
List of political parties in Saskatchewan
List of Saskatchewan provincial electoral districts

References
 Saskatchewan Archives Board - Election Results By Electoral Division
 Elections Saskatchewan

Specific

1995
1995 elections in Canada
1995 in Saskatchewan
June 1995 events in Canada